Dijana Naumoska (born 5 January 1985) is a Macedonian handball player for Žito Prilep and the Macedonian national team.

References

1985 births
Living people
Macedonian female handball players